Fennpfuhl is a German locality (Ortsteil) in the borough (Bezirk) of Lichtenberg, Berlin.

History
In April 1961, the land development of the area, called Lichtenberg (Nord) at that time, was begun, and planning was subdivided into three sections. In the Erich-Kuttner-Straße on the edge of the area (section I), the first Plattenbau, one of the most commonly built type of residence in East Germany, was built. The building, which was built as an experimental sample, is under monument protection today. On December 2, 1972, construction of the quarter began, the plan being to develop an area for almost 50,000 inhabitants. Populated since the early 1970s, it was officially completed on May 12, 1986.

Geography
Fennpfuhl is situated in the eastern side of the city, on the outside edge of the Hundekopf (dog's head), the colloquial name for central Berlin surrounded by the Ringbahn. It borders the localities of Lichtenberg, Alt-Hohenschönhausen, Weißensee and Prenzlauer Berg (both in Pankow district). An urban park (Fennpfuhlpark), characterized by numerous sculptures, is situated in the middle of the quarter.

Transport
As urban railways, the locality is served by the S-Bahn lines S4 (Ringbahn), S8 and S9, at the stations of Storkower Straße and Landsberger Allee. It is also served by the tramway lines M5, M6, M8, M13, 16 and 21.

Photo gallery

References

External links

 Fennpfuhl official website
 Fennpfuhl page on www.berlin.de

Localities of Berlin
Fennpfuhl